The  is a series of films set in Akihabara, Tokyo, Japan. The plots of the films revolve around the cosplay and otaku subcultures associated to the location, with themes such as maid cafés and collectible action figures.

The series was produced by VAP, and the distributor Asia Pulp Cinema released the trilogy on DVDs in the United States.

Movies in the trilogy

External links
Official website (archived)

References 

Film series introduced in 2006
Films set in Tokyo
Japanese film series
Akihabara
Cosplay
Trilogies
Otaku in fiction
2000s Japanese films